United States House Judiciary Subcommittee on Courts, the Internet, and Intellectual Property is a subcommittee within the House committee on the Judiciary. It has jurisdiction over the following subject matters: copyright, patent, trademark law, information technology, antitrust matters, other appropriate matters as referred by the Chairman, and relevant oversight.

Members, 112th Congress

See also
  United States House Committee on the Judiciary

References

External links 
 Official page

Judiciary Courts, the Internet, and Intellectual Property